Drakna, Drakne, or Chagnê is a township in Gyirong County, Tibet Autonomous Region of China.

In addition to Drakna, the township has five other villages: Nailong Village, Gampo Village, Kongmu Village, Tangguo Village, and Karon Village.

See also
List of towns and villages in Tibet

Notes

References

Gyirong County
Populated places in Shigatse
Township-level divisions of Tibet